Eicke's House (German: Eickesches Haus) is a listed residential timber frame building in north German Renaissance style, located in the pedestrian zone of Einbeck, Germany.

It was built in 1612 and named after its early 1900s owner, Eicke. The structure features double jettying and rich sculptural facade ornamentation by an unknown 17th-century wood carver. Conservation efforts have been successful for most of the sculptures which include the Christian Apostles and Jesus Christ, the seven Liberal arts, the four cardinal virtues as well as some of the Greek muses.
The building now houses the regional tourist information.

References

Further reading
Holger Reimers: Das Eickesche Haus. In: Einbecker Jahrbuch Band 50, 2007, S. 12–105

External links
 German link with picture
 German homepage

Houses completed in 1612
Buildings and structures in Northeim (district)
Renaissance architecture in Germany
Timber framed buildings in Germany
Einbeck
Houses in Germany
1612 establishments in the Holy Roman Empire